Colonial Park Cemetery (locally and informally, Colonial Cemetery) is a historic cemetery located in downtown Savannah, Georgia. It became a city park in 1896, 43 years after burials in the cemetery ceased.

The cemetery was established in 1750, when Savannah was the capital of the British Province of Georgia, last of the Thirteen Colonies. By 1789 it had expanded three times to reach its current six acres bounded by East Oglethorpe Avenue (to the north), Habersham Street (east), East Perry Lane (south) and Abercorn Street (west). Savannah's primary public cemetery throughout its 103 active years, its previous names have included the Old Cemetery, Old Brick Graveyard, South Broad Street Cemetery, and Christ Church Cemetery.

History
Originally built as the burial ground for the Christ Church Parish, in 1789 it became a cemetery for Savannahians of all denominations.
The cemetery was closed to burials in 1853, some eight years before the start of the American Civil War, so no Confederate soldiers are interred there. After Union troops occupied Savannah on December 24, 1864, the graveyard became a temporary home to "several hundred" Union soldiers. Soldiers allegedly damaged or defaced some of the stone markers (including altering some dates and ages) and sheltered inside vaults.

Notable burials
 John Berrien (1759–1815), major in the American Revolution (father of John M. Berrien, senator and attorney general)
 Archibald Bulloch (1730–1777), governor of Georgia's Provincial Congress
 Samuel Elbert (1740–1788), Revolutionary soldier and a governor of the state of Georgia
 Button Gwinnett (1735–1777), a signer of the Declaration of Independence
 James Habersham (1712–1775), acting royal governor of the Province of Georgia (father of John, Joseph and James Habersham Jr.)
 John Habersham (1754–1799), member of the Continental Congress (son of James Habersham, brother of Joseph and James Habersham Jr.)
 Joseph Habersham (1751–1815), Postmaster General of the United States under three presidents (son of James Habersham, brother of John and James Habersham Jr.)

 Edward Malbone (1777–1807), painter
 Lachlan McIntosh (1725–1806), major general in the Continental Army
 William Scarbrough, (1776–1838), sea captain

More than 700 victims of Savannah's 1820 yellow fever epidemic are also buried here.

The remains of major general Nathanael Greene (1742–1786) reposed in the cemetery's Graham vault between 1786 and 1901, at which point they were reinterred in Johnson Square, along with the remains of his eldest son, George. His remains had shared the vault with those of John Maitland, his arch-rival in the Revolutionary War. Maitland's remains were returned to his native Scotland in 1981.

References

External links
 A map of the cemetery
 

Cemeteries in Savannah, Georgia
Protected areas of Chatham County, Georgia
1750 establishments in Georgia (U.S. state)